The Owl and Pussycat is a pub at 34 Redchurch Street in the Shoreditch area of London.

It is a Grade II listed building, under its original name, The Crown, dating back to the 18th century.

It is part of the Geronimo Inns pub chain.

References

External links
 
 

Grade II listed pubs in London
Grade II listed buildings in the London Borough of Tower Hamlets
Shoreditch
Pubs in the London Borough of Tower Hamlets